The 2023 U-23 WBSC Men's Softball World Cup is the inaugural U-23 Men's Softball World Cup, an international softball tournament taking place in Paraná, Argentina from 15 to 23 April 2023. Originally scheduled for October 2022, the tournament was postponed due to a number of reasons. The bidding process was reopened and once again awarded to Paraná in Argentina.

Qualified teams

Squads

Venue
Estadio Mundialista de Sóftbol and El Plumazo in Paraná, Entre Ríos will host all the games across two fields.

Opening Round

Group A

Group B

Placement round

Super round

Symbols

Match balls
The match balls that will be used for the 2024 tournament are the Mizuno M170 balls.

Notes

References

U-23 World Cup
Softball
International sports competitions hosted by Argentina
2023 in youth sport
World championships in softball
World Baseball Softball Confederation competitions
Softball
Softball